Diego Fernández de Villalán (died 7 Jul 1556) was a Roman Catholic prelate who served as the fourth Bishop of Almería (1523–1556).

Biography
Diego Fernández de Villalán was ordained a priest in the Order of Friars Minor. On 17 July 1523, he was selected by the King of Spain and confirmed by Pope Adrian VI as Bishop of Almería. He served as Bishop of Almería until his death on 7 July 1556.

References 

1556 deaths
16th-century Roman Catholic bishops in Spain
Bishops appointed by Pope Adrian VI
Franciscan bishops